Leaname Maotoanong (born 9 May 1991) is a sprinter from Botswana competing in the 200 and 400 metres. He won a silver medal at the 2015 Summer Universiade. He won the gold medal with the Botswana 4 × 400 metres relay team setting the new national record of 3:01.89.

Competition record

References

External links
 

1991 births
Living people
Botswana male sprinters
Olympic athletes of Botswana
World Athletics Championships athletes for Botswana
Athletes (track and field) at the 2015 African Games
Athletes (track and field) at the 2019 African Games
Athletes (track and field) at the 2016 Summer Olympics
African Games silver medalists for Botswana
African Games medalists in athletics (track and field)
Universiade medalists in athletics (track and field)
Commonwealth Games medallists in athletics
Commonwealth Games gold medallists for Botswana
Athletes (track and field) at the 2018 Commonwealth Games
People from Central District (Botswana)
Universiade medalists for Botswana
Medalists at the 2015 Summer Universiade
Medallists at the 2018 Commonwealth Games